

Hits 
Nanjundi Kalyana
Deva
Indrajith
Yuddhakanda
Sharavegada saradara
Tarka
Gajapathi Garvabhanga
Hrudaya Geethe
C.B.I. Shankar
Love madi nodu
Hendthigelbedi
Yugapurusha
Rudra
Hongkongnalli Agent Amar
Parashuram
 Inspector Vikram

Released films 
The following is a list of films produced in the Kannada film industry in India in 1989, presented in alphabetical order.

References

External links
 http://www.bharatmovies.com/kannada/info/moviepages.htm
 http://www.kannadastore.com/

See also

Kannada films of 1988
Kannada films of 1990

1989
Kannada
Films, Kannada